The 2014 Nicky Rackard Cup is the tenth staging of the Nicky Rackard Cup hurling championship since its establishment by the Gaelic Athletic Association in 2005. The cup competition began on 26 April 2014 and will end on 14 June 2014.

Donegal were the defending champions, however, they were defeated in the semi-final stages. Tyrone won the title after defeating Fingal by 1-17 to 1-16 in the final. Longford defeated Sligo in the relegation/promotion playoff to earn promotion to the 2015 Nicky Rackard Cup with Sligo dropping down to the Lory Meagher Cup.

Structure
Seven teams compete. Two play in the preliminary round, and five go straight into Round 1.
The preliminary round winners advance to Round 1. The preliminary round losers go into Qualifier Round 1.
The Round 1 winners advance to the semi-finals. The Round 1 losers go into Qualifier Round 1.
There are four teams in Qualifier Round 1. The two winners advance to Qualifier Round 2. The Qualifier Round 1 losers go into a relegation playoff.
The winners of Qualifier Round 2 advance to the semi-finals.
There are four semi-finalists — the three Round 1 winners and the Qualifier Round 2 winner.
The semi-final winners advance to the final.
The final winners receive the Nicky Rackard Cup and are promoted to the Christy Ring Cup for 2015.
The Qualifier Round 1 losers play a relegation playoff. The losing team play a promotion/relegation playoff against the bottom-ranked team from the 2014 Lory Meagher Cup (Tier 4).

Fixtures/results

Preliminary round

Round 1

Qualifier round 1

Qualifier round 2

Relegation play-off

Semi-finals

Final

Promotion play-off

Championship statistics

Scoring

Widest winning margin: 
 
Most goals in a match: 

Most points in a match: 

Most goals by one team in a match: 

 Highest aggregate score: 

Lowest aggregate score: 

Most goals scored by a losing team:

Scoring statistics

Championship

Single game

References

External links
 GAA fixtures 2014

Nicky Rackard Cup
Nicky Rackard Cup